The following is a list of the television networks (American, Canadian, and French Canadian) and announcers that have broadcast the National Hockey League All-Star Game over the years.

American Television

2020s

Notes
The 2021 All-Star Game was not played due to the COVID-19 pandemic.

2010s

Notes
Versus (originally known as OLN) was renamed NBC Sports Network on January 2, 2012.
The 2015 All-Star Game was to be played on January 27, 2013, at Nationwide Arena in Columbus, Ohio, home of the Columbus Blue Jackets. This would have been the Jackets' first-ever hosting of the game. However, the game was postponed for two years, first because of the 2012–13 NHL lockout and then due to the league's participation in the 2014 Winter Olympics tournament.

2000s

Notes
Denis Leary was the third-man in the broadcast booth and called the final 40 minutes of the 2001 All-Star Game at Pepsi Center in Denver.
 Because ABC Sports had rights to both the NHL All-Star Game and the Pro Bowl, ABC aired the All-Star Game and the Pro Bowl on the same day from 2000 through 2003, excluding 2002. ABC dubbed these doubleheaders as “All-Star Sunday”.
 The All-Star Game was dealt two serious blows in 2005. Not only was the game canceled along with the rest of the season as a result of the 2004–05 NHL lockout, but the subsequent CBA that ended the lockout stipulated that heretofore the game was to be held only in non-Olympic years. Thus, there was no All-Star Game held during the 2005–06 season either.

1990s

Notes
NBC's coverage of the 1990 All-Star Game marked the first time in a decade that an American over-the-air television network (as opposed to cable) carried a NHL game nationally (since Game 6 of the 1980 Stanley Cup Finals aired on CBS). This is because the game itself was played on a Sunday afternoon instead of a Tuesday night, as was the case in previous years – marking the first time that a national audience would see Wayne Gretzky and Mario Lemieux play. Referees and other officials were also wired with microphones in this game, as were the two head coaches. Finally, NBC was allowed to conduct interviews with players during stoppages in play, to the chagrin of the Hockey Night in Canada crew, whose attempts to do likewise were repeatedly denied by the league in past years. (Technically, it was not quite a national broadcast as NBC's affiliates in Atlanta, Charlotte, Memphis, New Orleans, Indianapolis and Phoenix didn't air the game.)
In 1991, NBC broke away from the live telecast of the All-Star Game during the third period in favor of Gulf War coverage; SportsChannel America showed the rest of the contest later that day.
The 1995 All-Star Game was not played due to the 1994-95 NHL lockout.
The 1996 and 1997 All-Star Games were televised in prime time.
Fox debuted their "FoxTrax" puck during the 1996 All-Star Game.

1980s

Notes
The 1980 American coverage from Hughes used CBC's feed.
Locally in New York, the NHL All-Star Game was broadcast on WOR-TV Channel 9 until 1982. Beginning in 1983, it was broadcast on the NHL's cable TV partner.

1970s

Notes
The Challenge Cup replaced the All-Star Game in 1979. Staged at Madison Square Garden, the Challenge Cup was a best-of 3-series between the NHL All-Stars against the Soviet Union national squad. Games 1 and 3 were shown on the NHL Network, while Game 2 was carried, in bizarre fashion, on CBS. First, only the third period was aired on CBS (as part of CBS Sports Spectacular), which had a problem with the dasher board advertising that the NHL sold at Madison Square Garden. The network (after complaints from other CBS sponsors) refused to allow the ads to be shown; as a result, viewers were unable to view the far boards above the yellow kickplate, and could only see players' skates when the play moved to that side of the ice. (Games 1 and 3 were seen in their entirety on the NHL Network, which had no problem with the advertising.)

Canadian Television (English)

2020s

Notes
Due to its coverage of the 2022 Winter Olympics, CBC did not simulcast Sportsnet's coverage of the 2022 All-Star Game.

2010s

2000s

1990s

1980s

Notes
The 1986 Canadian coverage was to be provided by CTV. However, CTV had a prior commitment to carry a U.S. miniseries. As a result, TSN took over coverage of the game in Hartford.
In 1987, Rendez-vous '87 (a two-game series between a team of all-stars from the National Hockey League and the Soviet national team) replaced the All-Star Game. While the telecasts in Canada were on CBC as usual, they were not Hockey Night in Canada productions. The games were done as a CBC Sports production as Molson, who owned Hockey Night in Canada'''s rights at the time, was not allowed access to Le Colisée in Quebec City. Carling O'Keefe Breweries assumed advertising rights for the telecasts and the normal host(s) for Hockey Night in Canada in 1987, rookie Ron MacLean and Dave Hodge (before his late season firing) were replaced by Brian Williams. Even the ice blue blazers normally worn by Hockey Night in Canada'' commentators were replaced by the orange CBC sport-coats. Don Wittman and John Davidson called the action for CBC. The games were shown in the United States on ESPN, with Ken Wilson and Bill Clement in the booth and Tom Mees and John Saunders as the studio host.

1970s

1960s

1950s

French Canadian television

2020s

2010s

2000s

1990s

1980s

1970s

1960s

1950s

See also
National Hockey League All-Star Game

References

External links
Do You Care if The NHL All-Star Game is on Broadcast TV?

All-Star Game broadcasters
All-Star Game broadcasters
Broadcasters
ABC Sports
CBS Sports
Fox Sports announcers
CBC Sports
ESPN announcers
NBCSN
NBC Sports
SportsChannel
USA Network Sports
Ici Radio-Canada Télé
Hughes Television Network
The Sports Network
Sportsnet
All-Star Game broadcasters